Arturo García Yale (born 14 May 1965), also known as Torito in Bolivia, is a former football striker who was capped 8 times and scored 3 international goals for Bolivia in 1989. He is also the president of Asociación de Entrenadores de Fútbol en Santa Cruz (Football Coaches Association of Santa Cruz).

Personal life
García is married to Karina Vargas and together they have three children, María Raquel, Paula and Arturo Jr.

International career
On 1 May 1987, he was included for the 1988 Olympic Qualifying (May), and made his debut for an International match at for Bolivia Olympic against Argentina Olympic at Estadio Olimpico Miraflores La Paz but was subbed off in the match for Juan Manuel Pena. On May 3, of the same year he played for Bolivia Olympic against 1988 Olympic runners-up Brazil Olympic also at home at Estadio Olimpico Miraflores in which Bolivia lost 2-1 with an own goal from Geraldão.

He made his debut for the senior team of Bolivia on 25 May against Paraguay in which he scored two goals, one in the 38th minute and one in the 50th minute that helped his side win 3-2. He was substituted later in the match for Rolly Paniagua.

In June 1989, he was included in the 1989 Copa América for Bolivia. He made his Copa América debut for Bolivia on 4 July in Goiânia against Uruguay playing the whole match. Two days later he returned against Ecuador but was substituted for Erwin Sánchez.

Honours
Oriente Petrolero
Bolivian League:
1990

The Strongest
Bolivian League:
1993

San José
Bolivian League:
1995

References

External links

11v11.com Full International Profile

1965 births
Living people
Sportspeople from Santa Cruz de la Sierra
Association football forwards
Bolivian footballers
Bolivia international footballers
Oriente Petrolero players
C.D. Jorge Wilstermann players
The Strongest players
Club San José players
Club Blooming players
Al-Shoulla FC players
Club Destroyers players
1989 Copa América players
Bolivian expatriate footballers
Expatriate footballers in Saudi Arabia
Oriente Petrolero managers